James Paul Olsen (born 23 October 1981) in Liverpool, England, is an English professional footballer who played as a midfielder for Tranmere Rovers and Macclesfield Town in the Football League.

External links

1981 births
Living people
Sportspeople from Bootle
English footballers
Association football defenders
Tranmere Rovers F.C. players
Macclesfield Town F.C. players
Vauxhall Motors F.C. players
Altrincham F.C. players
Barrow A.F.C. players
Southport F.C. players
Stalybridge Celtic F.C. players
Colwyn Bay F.C. players
Burscough F.C. players
Marine F.C. players
English Football League players